RMS Franconia may refer to the following specific vessels:

 , ocean liner operated by the Cunard Line, launched on 23 July 1910
 , ocean liner operated by the Cunard Line from 1922 to 1956
 , ocean liner, built in 1955 as RMS Ivernia  and renamed RMS Franconia in 1963

Ship names